Zamindar were land-owning nobility in the Indian subcontinent.

Zamindar may also refer to:
 Zamindar (newspaper), a popular and influential Muslim newspaper in the Indian subcontinent run by Zafar Ali Khan
 Zamindar (1952 film), a 1952 Tamil film
 Zamindar (1965 film), a 1965 Telugu film
 Zamindar, Iran, a village in Hormozgan Province, Iran
 Manyam Zamindar, Zamindars from the family of Manyam, belonging to the Komati Arya Vysya Caste
 Fine-Leaf Wadara, a woody plant found in South America

Places 
 Wadera, Ethiopia
 Adolana Wadera